Lugnås guitars are produced by the Lugnås Gitarr AB factory in Lugnås, Sweden.

Early life

The original founder Hans Persson was born in 1914 in the small town of Lugnås, located between Sweden's two largest lakes Vänern and Vättern. His father worked as a fisherman and as the town's mason. Hans Persson played the guitar, the mandolin, and the violin. He experimented and built his own instruments, and when the reputation of the quality of his craftsmanship grew, he decided to pursue his dream and earn his living making guitars.

First workshop
He established his business in 1938 and built a factory in the backyard of his home. Hans Persson's instruments from the factory were labelled with Hans Persson Instrument and Lugnås.  The Lugnås guitar was born. 

The end of the Second World War led to a boost in household spending on leisure articles, e.g. guitars. In 1947 the factory received a break-through order for half a million guitar strings from Levin, a major Swedish guitar manufacturer based in Gothenburg. 

In 1951 the factory started manufacturing zithers, and as of today remains one of few global suppliers of zithers and zither strings. Hans Persson's son Lennart Persson joined the family business in 1959. Spurred by the emergence of guitar-based pop in the early 60's, production of guitars exploded.  The factory had 13 employees and an annual production of more than 3 000 guitars.

Classical guitars
In 1964 Hans Persson designed a range of classical guitars for Swedish guitar virtuoso Evert Ahlander. The 6 models ranged from school instruments (Student and Rondino) to standard and concert guitars (Menuett, Classic, Soloist and Concert). In total 7 000 guitars were manufactured under the Ahlander brand. A few years later, in 1967, Hans Persson launched a new range of guitars under the Swedtone brand. These included the Carina, Palermo, Cremona, Tarragona and the 7/8 sized school guitar Serenad. The Palermo and the Serenad were also available with steel strings. The Lugnås brand was refined with a new logotype in 1969, and the models Granada, Toledo, Sevilla, Valencia, Tarragona and Studio sold well until production ceased in 1976. During the 60's, the factory also supplied 70 000 necks to Levin and Goya guitars manufactured in Gothenburg. 

In the 70's, the Lugnås factory produced for jazz guitarist and music shop owner Birger Steiner under the Steiner and BS brands. The guitars were discontinued after Birger Steiner sold his business to EMI. 

When Levin changed ownership in 1982 and production was restarted the year after, Hans Persson guitar factory was contracted to manufacture bodies to the new models. In 1988, the production of Levin's top-of-the-line classical guitars, the Classic 8, 10 and 12 models, was moved to the factory. Since, 5 000 Levin guitars have left the Lugnås factory.

Family business
Lennart Persson took over after his father died in 1999. 

In 2012, Lugnås Gitarr AB was formed to secure Swedish guitar production in the Lugnås guitar factory, including Hans Persson's legacy brands Swedtone and Lugnås. 

To date, more than 45,000 guitars have been built in the Lugnås factory.

Further Information
Lugnås Swedish Quality Guitars Homepage for Lugnås guitars.
Levin guitars Homepage for Levin guitars.

Guitar makers
Musical instrument manufacturing companies of Sweden